A carrier battle group (CVBG) is a naval fleet consisting of an aircraft carrier capital ship and its large number of escorts, together defining the group. The CV in CVBG is the United States Navy hull classification code for an aircraft carrier.

The first naval task forces built around carriers appeared just prior to and during World War II.  The Imperial Japanese Navy (IJN) was the first to assemble many carriers into a single task force, known as Kido Butai.  This task force was used with devastating effect in the Japanese attack on Pearl Harbor.  Kido Butai operated as the IJN's main carrier battle group until four of its carriers were sunk at the Battle of Midway.  In contrast, the United States Navy deployed its large carriers in separate formations, with each carrier assigned its own cruiser and destroyer escorts.  These single-carrier formations would often be paired or grouped together for certain assignments, most notably the Battle of the Coral Sea and Midway.  By 1943, however, large numbers of fleet and light carriers became available, which required larger formations of three or four carriers.  These groups eventually formed the Fast Carrier Task Force, which became the primary battle unit of the U.S. Third and Fifth Fleets.

With the construction of the large "supercarriers" of the Cold War era, the practice of operating each carrier in a single formation was revived.  During the Cold War, the main role of the CVBG in case of conflict with the Soviet Union would have been to protect Atlantic supply routes between the United States and its NATO allies in Europe, while the role of the Soviet Navy would have been to interrupt these sea lanes, a fundamentally easier task.  Because the Soviet Union had no large carriers of its own, a situation of dueling aircraft carriers would have been unlikely.  However, a primary mission of the Soviet Navy's attack submarines was to track every allied battle group and, on the outbreak of hostilities, sink the carriers.  Understanding this threat, the CVBG expended enormous resources in its own anti-submarine warfare mission.

Carrier battle groups in crises 
In the late 20th and early 21st centuries, most uses of carrier battle groups by the United States as well as that of other Western nations have been in situations where their use has been uncontested by other comparable forces.  During the Cold War, an important battle scenario was an attack against a CVBG using numerous antiship missiles.

1956 Suez Crisis
British and French carrier battle groups were involved in the 1956 Suez Crisis.

1971 Indo-Pakistan war
Air strikes were carried out initially on shipping in the Chittagong and Cox's Bazar harbors, sinking or incapacitating most ships there. Further strikes were carried out on Cox's Bazar from 60 nautical miles (110 km) offshore. On the evening of 4 December, the air group struck Chittagong Harbour. Later strikes targeted Khulna and the Port of Mongla. Air strikes continued until 10 December 1971.

1982 Falklands War

The first attempted use of anti-ship missiles against a carrier battle group was part of Argentina's efforts against British Armed Forces during the Falklands War. This was the last conflict so far in which opposing belligerents employed aircraft carriers, although Argentina made little use of its sole carrier, originally built in the United Kingdom as HMS Venerable and later served with the Netherlands (1948–1968).

Lebanon
The United States Sixth Fleet assembled a force of three carrier battle groups and a battleship during the Lebanese Civil War in 1983. Daily reconnaissance flights were flown over the Bekaa Valley and a strike was flown against targets in the area resulting in loss of an A-6 Intruder and an A-7 Corsair.

Gulf of Sidra
Carrier battle groups routinely operated in the Gulf of Sidra inside the "Line of Death" proclaimed by Libya resulting in aerial engagements in 1981, 1986 and 1989 between U.S. Navy Tomcats and Libyan Su-22 aircraft, SA-5 surface-to-air missiles and MiG-23 fighters. During the 1986 clashes, three carrier battle groups deployed to the Gulf of Sidra and ultimately two of them conducted strikes against Libya in Operation El Dorado Canyon.

2011 military intervention in Libya
During the international military intervention in the 2011 Libyan civil war, the French Navy deployed its aircraft carrier, off Libya.

Applications

China
China plans to set up several carrier battle groups in the future.  At present China's two aircraft carriers, the Liaoning and Shandong, use Type 055 destroyers for area air defence with anti-submarine warfare, Type 052C or Type 052D destroyers for air defense, Type 054A frigates for anti-submarine and anti-ship warfare, 1–2 Type 093 nuclear attack submarines, and 1 Type 901 supply ship.  China is currently building a third carrier, expected to be launched in 2020 and enter active service in 2023, as well as a nuclear-powered fourth carrier planned for construction and expected to be completed by the late 2020s. China is also building a new larger class of air defense destroyers, the Type 055.

France
The carrier battle group of the Force d'Action Navale is known as the Groupe Aéronaval (GAN) and is usually composed, in addition to the aircraft carrier, of:
a carrier air wing (Groupe Aérien Embarqué, GAE, in French), a complement composed of about 40 aircraft:
Rafale F3 (up to 30)
E-2C Hawkeye (2)
SA365 Dauphin (3) for RESCO and EC725 Caracal for CSAR (2)
one 
two anti-submarine destroyers (currently FREMM ASM or )
one or two anti-air destroyers ( or )
one stealth frigate in forward patrol (usually a )
one supply ship (currently a )

This group is commanded by a rear admiral (contre-amiral, in French) on board the aircraft carrier. The commanding officer of the air group (usually a —equivalent to commander) is subordinate to the commanding officer of the aircraft carrier, a senior captain. The escort destroyers (called frigates in the French denomination) are commanded by more junior captains.

France also operates three s. While incapable of operating fixed-winged aircraft, they function as helicopter carriers and form the backbone of France's amphibious force. These ships are typically escorted by the same escorts the Charles De Gaulle uses.

India
 
The Indian Navy has been operating carrier battle groups since 1961, with its first carrier battle group formed around the now decommissioned . It was purchased by India in May 1987, and was decommissioned in March 2017. India commissioned  in 2013 and will follow this with a second carrier, the new INS Vikrant in 2022. INS Vikramaditya is the modified  , INS Vikrant will be the first indigenous Indian aircraft carrier. India plans to have three carrier battle groups by 2035, each centered on Vikrant, Vikramaditya and Vishal, another planned carrier.

The navy's new carrier battle group centered on Vikramaditya consists of the modern Kolkata class destroyers, Shivalik and Talwar-class frigates, Kamorta-class anti-submarine warfare corvettes and new tankers. INS Chakra is expected to fill the sub-surface component.

Italy
The CVS–ASW (Aircraft Carrier with Anti-Submarine Warfare)  is Italy's first carrier. The battle group based in Taranto called COMFORAL is formed by the carrier Giuseppe Garibaldi, two s, two support ships Etna and Elettra, and three amphibious/support ships (San Giusto, San Marco and San Giorgio).

After 2010, the Italian battle group will be formed by the new , 5–6 new warships (including destroyers Horizon and frigates FREMM), one new support ship, some minehunters and new submarines (the COMFORAL will be a reserve group).

Russia
These escorts, especially the heavily armed Kirov-class battlecruiser, use advanced sensors and carry a variety of weaponry. During Admiral Kuznetsovs deployment to Syria in November 2016 on her first combat tour, the carrier was escorted by a pair of Udaloy-class destroyers and a Kirov-class battlecruiser en route, while additional Russian Navy warships met her off Syria.

Admiral Kuznetsov is designed specifically to sail alone and carries greater firepower than her U.S. counterparts. This includes 12x SS-N-19 'Shipwreck' (long range, high speed, sea-skimming) SSMs, 24x VLS units loaded with 192 SA-N-9 'Gauntlet' SAMs, and 8x Kashtan CIWS with dual 30 mm guns, and 8x AK-630 CIWS. Compared to the 4x Phalanx CIWS and 4x Sea Sparrow launchers, each with 8 missiles carried by the Nimitz-class, Admiral Kuznetsov is well armed for both air-defence and offensive operations against hostile shipping.

United Kingdom

During this period, the Royal Navy worked to regenerate its carrier strike capability based on the Carrier-Enabled Power Projection (CEPP) concept by ordering two Queen Elizabeth-class aircraft carriers and the F-35B Lightning to operate from them. To maintain its skills and experience, the Royal Navy embedded personnel and ships with partner navies, in particular the United States Navy.

In 2017, the first Queen Elizabeth-class aircraft carrier  entered service followed by her sister ship  in 2019. The first carrier strike group took to sea in September 2019 as part of an exercise known as Westlant 19. HMS Queen Elizabeth and her air group of F-35B Lightning jets operated alongside two surface escorts and a fleet tanker off the east coast of the United States. The deployment was in preparation for the first operational deployment in 2021, which is expected to involve HMS Queen Elizabeth alongside four Royal Navy escorts, two support ships and a submarine.

Under current plans, a Royal Navy carrier strike group will typically comprise a Queen Elizabeth-class aircraft carrier, two air defence destroyers, two anti-submarine frigates, a submarine, solid stores ship and a fleet tanker, however the composition varies depending on the operational tasking. While Queen Elizabeth'''s initial deployment will be as part of an all-British carrier group, it is envisaged in the longer term that the UK's carriers will usually form the centre of a multi-national operation – in 2018, it was announced that the British and Dutch governments had come to an agreement that would see escort vessels of the Royal Netherlands Navy operating as part of the UK Carrier Strike Group. Command of the UK carrier strike group is the responsibility of Commander United Kingdom Carrier Strike Group. A June 2020 National Audit Office report however provided a critical review of the forthcoming Carrier Strike Group, especially noting the delay to the Crowsnest system.

United States
Carrier strike group

In modern United States Navy carrier air operations, a carrier strike group (CSG) normally consists of 1 aircraft carrier, 1 guided missile cruiser (for air defense), 2 LAMPS-capable warships (focusing on anti-submarine and surface warfare), and 1–2 anti-submarine destroyers or frigates. The large number of CSGs used by the United States reflects, in part, a division of roles and missions allotted during the Cold War, in which the United States assumed primary responsibility for blue-water operations and for safeguarding supply lines between the United States and Europe, while the NATO allies assumed responsibility for less costly brown- and green-water operations. The CSG has replaced the old term of carrier battle group (CVBG or CARBATGRU).  The US Navy maintains 11 carrier strike groups, 9 of which are based in the United States and one that is forward deployed in Yokosuka, Japan.

Expeditionary strike group
An expeditionary strike group is composed of an amphibious assault ship (LHA/LHD), a dock landing ship (LSD), an amphibious transport dock (LPD), a Marine expeditionary unit, AV-8B Harrier II or, more recently Lockheed Martin F-35B Lightning II aircraft, CH-53E Super Stallion and CH-46E Sea Knight helicopters or, more recently, MV-22B tiltrotors.  Cruisers, destroyers and attack submarines are deployed with either an Expeditionary Strike Group or a Carrier Strike Group.

Battleship battle group
During the period when the American navy recommissioned all four of its s, it sometimes used a similar formation centered on a battleship, referred to as a battleship battle group.  It was alternately referred to as a surface action group.

Surface action group
A surface action group is "a temporary or standing organization of combatant ships, other than carriers, tailored for a specific tactical mission".

Underway replenishment

Since its origins, the viability of the carrier battle group has been dependent on its ability to remain at sea for extended periods. Specialized ships were developed to provide underway replenishment of fuel (for the carrier and its aircraft), ordnance, and other supplies necessary to sustain operations. Carrier battle groups devote a great deal of planning to efficiently conduct underway replenishment to minimize the time spent conducting replenishment. The carrier can also provide replenishment on a limited basis to its escorts, but typically a replenishment ship such as a fast combat support ship (AOE) or replenishment oiler (AOR) pulls alongside a carrier and conducts simultaneous operations with the carrier on its port side and one of the escorts on its starboard side. The advent of the helicopter provides the ability to speed replenishment by lifting supplies at the same time that fueling hoses and lines are delivering other goods.

Debate on future viability
There is debate in naval warfare circles as to the viability of carrier battle groups in 21st century naval warfare. Proponents of the CVBG argue that it provides unmatched firepower and force projection capabilities. Opponents argue that CVBGs are increasingly vulnerable to arsenal ships and cruise missiles, especially those with supersonic or even hypersonic flight and the ability to perform radical trajectory changes to avoid anti-missile systems. It is also noted that CVBGs were designed for Cold War scenarios, and are less useful in establishing control of areas close to shore. It is argued however that such missiles and arsenal ships pose no serious threat as they would be eliminated due to increasing improvement in ship defenses such as Cooperative Engagement Capability (CEC), DEW technology and missile technology.

Additionally, carrier battle groups proved to be vulnerable to diesel-electric submarines owned by many smaller naval forces.

However, carriers have been called upon to be first responders even when conventional land based aircraft were employed. During Desert Shield, the U.S. Navy sortied additional carriers to augment the on station assets eventually maintaining six carriers for Desert Storm. Although the U.S. Air Force sent fighters such as the F-16 to theater in Desert Shield, they had to carry bombs with them as no stores were in place for sustained operations, whereas the carriers arrived on scene with full magazines and had support ships to allow them to conduct strikes indefinitely.

The Global War on Terror has shown the flexibility and responsiveness of the carrier on multiple occasions when land based air was not feasible or able to respond in a timely fashion. After the 11 September terrorist attacks on the U.S., carriers immediately headed to the Arabian Sea to support Operation Enduring Freedom and took up station, building to a force of three carriers. Their steaming location was closer to the targets in Afghanistan than any land based assets and thereby more responsive. The  was adapted to be a support base for special operations helicopters. Carriers were used again in Operation Iraqi Freedom and even provided aircraft to be based ashore on occasion and have done so periodically when special capabilities are needed. This precedent was established during World War II in the Battle of Guadalcanal.

Regardless of the debate over viability, the United States has made a major investment in the development of a new carrier class—the s (formerly designated CVN-X, or the X Carrier)—to replace the existing s. The new Ford''-class carriers are designed to be modular and are easily adaptable as technology and equipment needed on board changes.

See also
 Amphibious ready group
 Naval tactics
 U.S. Carrier Group tactics

References

Bibliography

External links

 Carrier Battle Group – GlobalSecurity.org
 Current global location of active, proposed, and decommissioned carriers

 
Aircraft carriers
Naval warfare
Naval units and formations by size
Naval units and formations